Group 17 is a rugby league competition based in the Riverina and Central West regions of New South Wales, Australia.  The competition collapsed in 2006 and reformed in 2018 as the Western Riverina Community Cup with six teams.

The season runs from mid-May to late July, and features a knockout, six regular season rounds, and a three week finals series culminating in the Grand Final which is hosted by a different team each year.

History
Group 17 was formed in 1935 and originally centred around Griffith and Leeton, but was suspended during World War II. However, when rugby league returned to normal competition after the war, Leeton, along with Griffith, Yenda, Yanco and others, joined the Wagga Wagga competition, Group 20. Group 20 later became the Griffith and District competition after the Wagga clubs joined Group 9.

Rugby league in the Western Riverina district began as an inter-town competition between Hillston, Merriwagga, Goolgowi and Hay. The competition was suspended during World War 2. 

It reformed in 1947 as the 'Western Zone' with teams from Hay, Darlington Point, Goolgowi, Carrathool and two teams from Hillston, 'Town' and 'Country'. Tullibigeal joined during the 1950s, and won the 1965 Clayton Cup, the Country Rugby League's highest honour, but later departed to form the TLU Sharks with Lake Cargelligo in Group 20. In 1959, the league became known as Group 17. In 1968, two of the competition's biggest teams, Darlington Point and Coleambally merged and joined the neighbouring Group 20 Rugby League (Griffith and District) competition. Darlington Point had far outgrown the competition, going undefeated in 1968 to win the Clayton Cup, and had already joined Group 20 the following year in 1969.

Throughout the 1980s and 1990s, the competition sustained a high level of competition, with eight clubs participating. More Clayton Cups were won by Group 17 clubs, with Rankins Springs (1993), Barellan (1999 and 2002) and Hillston (2006) all claiming the trophy. But by the 2000s, the Millennial Drought had caused many of the teams to be weakened, due to farming, the primary industry in the region, becoming not only unprofitable, but almost impossible. The competition collapsed after the 2006 season.

The competition was revived in 2018 as the Group 17 ProTen Community Cup, with six teams participating. The format involved a knockout and five rounds followed by semi-finals and a grand final. In each round, all three games were played at the same venue. The season increased to six games the following year, where it has remained.

Clubs

Previous Clubs
Past participants in the Group 17 competition included:
  Carrathool (defunct)
  Coleambally Greens (Merged with Darlington Point and joined Group 20 in 1973)
  Darlington Point Roosters (Joined Group 20 in 1969, merged with Coleambally in 1973) - Premierships: 3 (1963-64, 1968)
  Deniliquin Blue Heelers (defunct c.1975) - Premierships: 3 (1969–71) 
  Finley Tigers (Reserve Grade, Moved to Goulburn Murray Rugby League)
  Griffith Three Ways United (Now only play in NSW Koori Knockout)
  Hanwood Warriors (defunct)
  Hay Magpies (now in Group 20) - Premierships: 12 (1959–61, 1967, 1972, 1975, 1982, 1989–91, 1994–95)
  Lake Cargelligo Sharks (Merged with Tullibigeal and joined Group 20)
  Merriwagga Eagles (Merged into Goolgowi RLFC)
  Murrin Bridge-Euabalong Tigers (No longer compete in regular competition)
  Tullibigeal (Merged with Lake Cargelligo and joined Group 20)
  Weethalle Kangaroos (defunct)
  Whitton Bulls (defunct)
Bold indicates that the club fielded a team in the 2006 First-Grade competition.

Grand Finals

The use of (*) indicates that the premiers for that season won the Clayton Cup as the premier team in NSWCRL competitions statewide (regionally, excludes Sydney) for that year.

Sources

References

Sport in the Riverina
Rugby league competitions in New South Wales